Chigger Hill is an unincorporated community in DeKalb County, Alabama, United States.

History
Chigger Hill was named from the fact the original settlers had to combat a serious infestation of mites. It has frequently been noted on lists of unusual place names.

References

Unincorporated communities in DeKalb County, Alabama
Unincorporated communities in Alabama